Jason Nazimuddin Mohammed (born  23 September 1986) is a Trinidadian cricketer. He plays first-class and List A cricket for Trinidad and Tobago. And internationally played for West Indies cricket team in limited overs cricket.

Cricketing career
Mohammed is an aggressive right-handed middle-order batsman and a part-time off spinner. In 2006, he made his debut in first class and represented West Indies in the Under-19 World Cup. Since then, he has been in the squad for most of T&T's first-class matches. He made his ODI debut in 2011 against India at Chennai before playing his next ODI almost 4 years later in 2015.

In November 2016, Mohammed was added to the West Indies' ODI squad for the 2016–17 Zimbabwe Tri-Series. In March 2017, he was named in the West Indies squad for the Twenty20 International (T20I) series against Pakistan. He made his T20I debut for the West Indies against Pakistan on 1 April 2017. On 6 April 2017, West Indies chased the highest total in their cricket history, Jason had a major role in that chase by playing an innings of 91 not out. Needing 128 off 13 overs, Mohammed supported by Ashley Nurse sailed West Indies to a historic victory. He was declared Man of the Match. On 29 September 2017, against England he captained the West Indies for the first time in ODIs.

In March 2018, Mohammed was named as the captain of the West Indies squad for their Twenty20 International (T20I) series against Pakistan.

In August 2019, Mohammed joined the St. Kitts and Nevis Patriots as a replacement for Isuru Udana. In November 2019, he was named in Trinidad and Tobago's squad for the 2019–20 Regional Super50 tournament. In February 2020, in the fourth round of the 2019–20 West Indies Championship, Mohammed scored his tenth century in first-class cricket.

In December 2020, Mohammed was named as the captain of the West Indies' ODI squad for their series against Bangladesh.

References

External links
 

1986 births
Living people
West Indies One Day International cricketers
West Indies Twenty20 International cricketers
Trinidad and Tobago cricketers
Trinbago Knight Riders cricketers
Guyana Amazon Warriors cricketers